Robert Holden Webb (22 February 1806 – 10 March 1880) was an English cricketer with amateur status, later an Anglican priest.

Webb was educated at Eton College and then Christ's College, Cambridge. He is recorded as playing for Cambridge University in three first-class cricket matches from 1826 to 1827, totalling 24 runs with a highest score of 10 and holding no catches. He was ordained as a Church of England priest in 1830 and was rector of Essendon from 1844 until his death.

References

1806 births
1880 deaths
People educated at Eton College
Alumni of Christ's College, Cambridge
Cambridge University cricketers
English cricketers
English cricketers of 1826 to 1863
People from Ham, London
19th-century English Anglican priests